Chrysler Festival is a Canadian variety concert television miniseries which aired on CBC Television in 1957.

Premise
The concerts were recorded at Loew's Uptown Theatre in Toronto, with two thousand attendees in the theatre. Lucio Agostini was the series musical director.

Scheduling
The series aired on selected Wednesdays at 10:00 p.m. (Eastern time) as a mid-year replacement for Folio. Episodes were broadcast as follows:

 14 November 1956: The Dave Brubeck Quartet, Edmund Hockridge, Shirley Jones, Eartha Kitt, Royal Winnipeg Ballet
 28 November 1956: Larry Adler, Percy Faith, Tito Gobbi with Pilar Lorengar, Bob Hamilton Trio (American dance group), Peter Sellers
 23 January 1957: Lisa Della Casa with Richard Tucker (opera duet), Ferrante & Teicher, José Greco, Edith Piaf, La Ronde from New Faces of 1956
 20 February 1957: Kaye Ballard, Rosemary Clooney with Bill Johnson, Dorothy Dandridge, Maureen Forrester, Glenn Gould, Mata and Hari (dancers)
 20 March 1957: André Eglevsky, The Four Lads, Melissa Hayden, George Shearing Quintet.
 17 April 1957: Marian Anderson, George London, Oscar Peterson Trio

References

External links
 
 

CBC Television original programming
1950s Canadian music television series
1957 Canadian television series debuts
1957 Canadian television series endings
Black-and-white Canadian television shows